The Provisional Government was formed as a revolutionary committee of notables during the Belgian Revolution on 24 September 1830 at the Brussels City Hall under the name of Administrative Commission.

History

On 26 September the Administrative Commission assumed the title of Provisional Government, and two days later on 28 September it set up a Central Committee. This Central Committee proclaimed the independence of the "provinces of Belgium" on 4 October 1830. Afterwards, the term Provisional Government was increasingly used to refer to the Central Committee. Apart from the Central Committee, there also were Special Committees for War, Internal Affairs, Finance, Justice, Public Safety and Diplomacy.

The Provisional Government exercised both executive and legislative power until 10 November 1830, when the National Congress met for the first time. On 12 November it formally returned its powers to the National Congress, which subsequently decided to entrust executive power to the Provisional Government. It was dissolved on 25 February 1831 after Erasme, Baron Surlet de Chokier had been appointed Regent by the National Congress.

Members of the Provisional Government
Charles Rogier (chairman, member from 25 September 1830-25 February 1831)
Emmanuel, Baron van der Linden d'Hooghvorst (member from 24 September-12 November 1830)
Félix, Count de Mérode (member from 26 September 1830-25 February 1831)
Alexandre Gendebien (member from 26 September 1830-25 February 1831)
Sylvain Van de Weyer (member from 26 September 1830-25 February 1831)
André-Edouard Jolly (member from 24 September 1830-25 February 1831)
Feuillen, Baron de Coppin de Falaën (member from 24 September 1830-25 February 1831)
Joseph Van der Linden (member from 24 September 1830-25 February 1831)
Louis de Potter (member from 28 September-13 November 1830)
Jean Nicolay (member from 25 September-10 October 1830)

See also
 Belgian Revolution
 History of Belgium
 Provisional government

References

Belgian governments
Belgian Revolution
Government of Belgium
1830 establishments in Belgium
1831 disestablishments in Belgium
Provisional governments